Bandu Patil (born 16 September 1942) is an Indian wrestler. He competed in two events at the 1964 Summer Olympics.

References

External links
 

1942 births
Living people
Indian male sport wrestlers
Olympic wrestlers of India
Wrestlers at the 1964 Summer Olympics
Place of birth missing (living people)